Stephen Maxym (July 17, 1915 – October 12, 2002) was an American bassoonist.

Born in New York City, he attended the Institute of Musical Arts (now The Juilliard School) before Joining the Pittsburgh Symphony Orchestra as Principal Bassoon under Fritz Reiner.  After serving in the US Merchant Marine during World War II, he auditioned for Erich Leinsdorf to become Principal Bassoon of the Metropolitan Opera Orchestra, a position he maintained until he retired from his active orchestral career.  While at the Metropolitan Opera, he performed under many of the great conductors of his day, including Herbert von Karajan, Karl Böhm, Rafael Kubelík, Leonard Bernstein, Georg Solti, et al.  He was also a distinguished teacher of both bassoon and chamber music, serving on the faculties of the Juilliard School, the Manhattan School of Music, the Banff Centre, and the University of Southern California, the New England Conservatory, the Yale School of Music, and the Hartt School of Music.

1915 births
2002 deaths
Juilliard School alumni
United States Merchant Mariners
Juilliard School faculty
Manhattan School of Music faculty
University of Southern California faculty
New England Conservatory faculty
University of Hartford Hartt School faculty
Yale School of Music faculty
American classical bassoonists
20th-century American musicians
20th-century classical musicians